was a Japanese neuroscientist, and director of the Riken Brain Science Institute.

Overviews 
Masao Ito was the main force behind Japanese neuroscience and its international recognition for many years. He was very active in the International Brain Research Organisation (IBRO) and went on to establish the Federation of Asian-Oceanian Neuroscience Societies (FAONS) in an effort to join together East Asian neuroscientists and facilitate interactions without dependence on American/European influences. This organisation is still active and acts in concert with IBRO's own Asia-Pacific Regional Committee which was set up in 1999. His roles in international scientific diplomacy, raising funds for neuroscience in the region and establishing the Riken Brain Science Institute were pivotal in promoting neuroscience throughout the East Asian countries. 

He won the 2006 Gruber Prize in Neuroscience and the 1996 Japan Prize. He was elected a Foreign Member of the Royal Society in 1992.

Life

Ito graduated from the University of Tokyo with an M.D. in 1953 and a Ph.D. in 1959. He was a research fellow at Australian National University from 1959 to 1962.  He taught at the University of Tokyo from 1963.

Ito died on 18 December 2018 at the age of 90.

References

External links 
 
 

1928 births
2018 deaths
People from Nagoya
Foreign Members of the Royal Society
Foreign Members of the Russian Academy of Sciences
Foreign associates of the National Academy of Sciences
Academic staff of the University of Tokyo
University of Tokyo alumni
Japanese neuroscientists
Recipients of the Order of Culture
Riken personnel
Members of the Royal Swedish Academy of Sciences